The Blind Princess and the Poet is a 1911 American short silent drama film directed by D. W. Griffith and starring Blanche Sweet.

Cast
 Blanche Sweet as The Princess
 Charles West as The Poet
 Charles Gorman
 Francis J. Grandon
 Guy Hedlund
 Grace Henderson
 Florence La Badie
 Jeanie MacPherson
 W. Chrystie Miller
 Alfred Paget
 Gladys Egan as Equality

See also
 List of American films of 1911
 D. W. Griffith filmography
 Blanche Sweet filmography

References

External links

1911 films
American silent short films
Biograph Company films
American black-and-white films
1911 drama films
1911 short films
Films directed by D. W. Griffith
Silent American drama films
1910s American films